Acronychia parviflora is a species of shrub or small rainforest tree that is endemic to north-eastern Queensland. It has simple, egg-shaped to elliptical leaves, flowers arranged singly or in small groups in leaf axils and fleshy, more or less spherical fruit.

Description

Taxonomy
Acronychia parviflora was first formally described in 1933 by Cyril Tenison White in the journal, Contributions from the Arnold Arboretum of Harvard University.

Distribution and habitat

Conservation status
This species is classified as of "least concern" under the Queensland Government Nature Conservation Act 1992.

References

parviflora
Flora of Queensland
Plants described in 1933
Taxa named by Cyril Tenison White